Los Muertos Pier is a pier along Playa de los Muertos in Puerto Vallarta's Zona Romántica, in the Mexican state of Jalisco. Completed in 2013, the structure replaced an older wooden pier depicted in the 1964 film The Night of the Iguana. It offers views of the Bay of Banderas and features a central metal structure which resembles a ship's sail.

Designed by José de Jesus Torres Vega, the pier has been described as a symbol of the city.

See also

 List of piers

References

External links
 

2013 establishments in Mexico
Buildings and structures completed in 2013
Buildings and structures in Puerto Vallarta
Piers
Zona Romántica